Skarżyce may refer to the following places in Poland:
Skarżyce, Lower Silesian Voivodeship (south-west Poland)
Skarżyce, Masovian Voivodeship (east-central Poland)